The 2015 ASP World Championship Tour (WCT) was the first year of the World Surf League, which grew out of the Association of Surfing Professionals. Men and women competed in separate tours with events taking place from late February to mid-December, at various surfing locations around the world. The surfer with the most points at the end of the tour (after discarding their two worst results) was named the 2015 ASP Surfing World Champion. Adriano de Souza of Brazil won the men's world title with 57,000 points. Carissa Moore of the USA won the women's world title with 66,200 points.

2015 Championship Tour

2015 Men's Championship Tour Jeep Leaderboard

Points are awarded using the following structure:

 Championship Tour surfers best 9 of 11 results are combined to equal their final point total.
 Tournament  results discarded
Legend

Source

Women's Championship Tour Jeep Leaderboard

Points are awarded using the following structure:

 Championship Tour surfers best 8 of 10 results are combined to equal their final point total.
 Tournament  results discarded

Legend

Source

Qualifying Series

MQS

Legend

Source

WQS

Legend

Source

References

External links

 
World Surf League
World League